Fart is a Russian criminal drama about fartsovka (a widespread phenomenon in the USSR from the 1950s-1980s).

In early 2017 Fartsa became one of the first Russian TV series to be sold to the world's largest American online video service, Netflix.

Story 
Kostya Germanov has lost badly at cards, and is heavily in debt to organized criminals. His three friends, Andrei, Boris and Sanya, decide to help Kostya. The four friends are forced to become speculators as it is the only way to help their friend.

Episodes 
The premiere was broadcast March 30, 2015 on Russia's Channel One.

Episodes 1-2: The series is set in 1961, Moscow, in the epoch of Gagarin and space exploration. Novice writer Andrei, who has had a short story published in Yunost, returns to his hometown. He is met by his childhood friends. Soon all of them - Andrei, Boris, Sanya, and Kostya - become fartsovschiki. At the same time, they have a stormy personal life: Andrei is happy with his fiancée Nadya, Kostya is in love with Boris's sister Zina, and Boris is fascinated by the prostitute Tatyana that he meets at work. Nobody knows about Sanya's secret love. Andrei, with the help of Yanskoy's editor, Lanskaya, becomes the secretary of Mikhail Svetlov. After daring successful adventures, the guys come to the attention of the criminal overlord Pont.

Episode 3: At the music-lover Boris's suggestion, the friends start producing and marketing illegal copies of records made on X-rays. They decide to hide the money from their sales in the cell of the storage chamber. The friends clash with currency traders, to whom Kostya in also heavily in debt. To save everyone, someone must take the blame.

Episode 4: A year later, the friends reach a new level and begin to experiment with cinematographic equipment. The director of commissions, against whom the guys have compromising evidence, is forced to help them. Major Vostrikov, Nadi's father, starts on the trail of the daring fartsovshchiki, unaware that he is well acquainted with the organizer of transactions.

Episode 5: Andrei has had a long-standing affair with Lanskaya, but she chases him away: everything that he now writes is gray and inept. Andrei gets drunk and does not attach importance to the disappearance of Tatiana, who is to meet with a foreigner at the National hotel to receive money. Zina is called to help - she speaks English well.

Episode 6: The friends decide to divide their shared money and engage in fartsovka. Vostrikov's investigation is complete: he demands that Andrei write a full confession, but Nadya does not allow it. Andrei learns about the underground illegal gambling den run by Pont.

Episode 7: The friends gather in the garage to share the money. But the cache is empty. Everyone suspects Kostya. Sanya proposes to Nadya, to her surprise. Vostrikov raids Pont's underground gambling den, but only arrests one person.

Episode 8: Vostrikov releases Andrei on parole from the cells for one hour so that he can take care of something. Zina comes to Andrei in the cells and confesses that she loves him. Andrei's trial sees an unexpected witness.

Cast
Alexander Petrov as Andrei Trofimov
 Philipp Gorenstein as Boris Zeller
 Yevgeny Stychkin as Maksim Pontonov (Pont)
 Zoya Berber as Nadya Vostrikova
 Aleksei Serebryakov as German Vostrikov
 Taisiya Vilkova as Zina Zeller
 Aleksandr Yatsenko as Sergei Zadorozhny
 Yekaterina Volkova as Valeria Lanskaya, editor of Yunost
 Lyudmila Arinina as grandma Rusha
 Daniil Strakhov as Gennady Shpalikov
 Yevgeny Tsyganov as Yan Rokotov

Film crew 

 Editors — Maxim Urmanov, Dmitry Slyusarchuk, Sergey Akimov
 Second Director — Galina Strizhevskaya
 Second Operator — Artyom Ignatov
 Chief Editor — Olga Shentorovich
 Stunt Coordinator — Viktor Ivanov
 Production Designer — Sergey Tyrin
 Costume Designer — Ekaterina Dyminskaya
 Make-up Artist — Natalia Krymskaya
 Make-up — Olga Mironova
 Sound Producer — Valentin Shupenich

References

External links
 

Russian television series
2010s Russian television series
2015 Russian television series debuts
2015 Russian television series endings
Channel One Russia original programming
Russian drama television series
Television series set in the 1960s